USS Skenandoa (YT-336), later YTM-336, was a United States Navy harbor tug named for Oneida chief, Skenandoa.

Built in 1909 as a commercial tug, Mathilda Foss was acquired by the U.S. Navy for World War II service on 11 February 1943 and was placed in service as Skenandoa.

Skenandoa spent her navy career operating in the Hawaiian Islands. She was reclassified as a medium harbor tug and redesignated YTM-336 on 15 May 1944.

The navy returned Skenandoa to her owners on 25 January 1946.

References
 

Tugs of the United States Navy
World War II auxiliary ships of the United States
1909 ships